"As Time Goes By" is a jazz song written by Herman Hupfeld in 1931. It became famous when it featured in the 1942 Warner Bros. film  Casablanca, performed by Dooley Wilson as Sam. The song was voted No. 2 on the AFI's 100 Years...100 Songs special, commemorating the best songs in film (surpassed only by "Over the Rainbow" by Judy Garland). The song has since become the signature tune of Warner Bros. and used as such in the production logos at the beginning of many Warner Bros. films since January 16, 1998 with Fallen as part of the 75th-anniversary opening montage before the feature presentation trailers for the movie theatre chains and the main on-screen logo since February 12, 1999 with Message in a Bottle, as well as the closing logos to most Warner Bros. Television Studios shows since fall 2003 with Two and a Half Men, and preexisting shows also switching over from a previous theme that had been used since 1994. 

The song was covered by Jimmy Durante, Louis Armstrong, Frank Sinatra, Nancy Sinatra, Harry Nilsson, Vera Lynn and Bryan Ferry. It was also the title and theme song of the 1990s British romantic comedy series As Time Goes By. 
National Public Radio included it in its "NPR 100", a 1999 list of the most important American musical works of the 20th century as compiled by NPR's music editors. The song is a popular reflection of nostalgia and often used in films and series reflecting this feeling.

Background
Herman Hupfeld wrote "As Time Goes By" for the Broadway musical Everybody's Welcome which opened on October 31, 1931. In the original show, it was sung by Frances Williams. It was first recorded by Rudy Vallée on July 25, 1931 for Victor Records, then also by Jacques Renard and his Orchestra on Brunswick Records and Fred Rich. In 1932, Binnie Hale recorded the song. Elisabeth Welch included the song in her cabaret act soon after it was released. In terms of popularity at the time, it was a modest hit.

The song was re-introduced in the 1942 film Casablanca where it was sung by Sam, portrayed by Dooley Wilson. Sam's piano accompaniment was played by a studio pianist, Jean Vincent Plummer. The melody is heard throughout the film as a leitmotif. Wilson was unable to make a commercial recording of the song at the time due to the 1942–44 musicians' strike. Unable to record new versions of the song, RCA Victor reissued the 1931 recording by Rudy Vallée, which became a number one hit eleven years after it was originally released. Brunswick also reissued the 1931 Jacques Renard recording.

Hupfeld lived his whole life in Montclair, New Jersey, and was a regular customer at the Robin Hood Inn (now the Valley Regency), a tavern built in 1922 on Valley Road, then part of Upper Montclair. He spent many hours at the piano and wrote several of his songs in this tavern. A plaque on the second floor of the Valley Regency Catering Facility in Clifton, New Jersey, commemorates the song. He wrote over one hundred songs, including "Let's Put Out the Lights and Go to Sleep," and the popular Great Depression song "Are You Making Any Money?"

Composition and lyrics
The song was originally published in the key of E-flat major.  In the film as sung and played by "Sam", it was recorded in D-flat major.  It has since been played in several keys, commonly C major, but also B-flat major, as in Frank Sinatra's recording, and other keys including A major and E-flat major.

Like many later singers, Wilson in Casablanca starts with "You must remember this, a kiss is still a kiss...", singing only the verses and refrain ("As time goes by"). He entirely omits the intro that put those "fundamental things" into context: "This day and age we're living in/Gives cause for apprehension[...] Yet we get a trifle weary/With Mr Einstein's theory/So we must get down to earth at times [...] The simple facts of life [...] cannot be removed". At least one version moves the intro into the middle of the song.

Use by Warner Bros.

The song has been used as Warner Bros.' signature song in the production logos at the beginning of many Warner Bros. films since January 16, 1998 with Fallen as part of the 75th anniversary opening montage before the feature presentation trailers for the movie theatre chains and the main on-screen logo since February 12, 1999 with Message in a Bottle, as well as the closing logos to most Warner Bros. Television Studios shows since fall 2003 with Two and a Half Men, with preexisting shows also switching over from a previous theme that had been used since 1994. 

The original fanfare debuted in 1998 during the studio's 75th anniversary with an opening montage, which would later be used in 1999. It would later be re-orchestrated for the new logo's fanfare, composed by Ludwig Göransson, which was favored over Billy Mallery's composition and four other composers, which debuted on April 21, 2021 in Italy with Non Mi Uccidere (the television counterpart debuted before its movie counterpart on March 4, 2021 with Young Sheldon season 4 episode 10, entitled "Cowboy Aerobics and 473 Grease-free Bolts"). In the new version, the fanfare now played in a different key and has a more powerful build up and the opening notes are now played on a guitar and flute as opposed to a piano.

Charts
Wilson's version was re-released in parts of the world in late 1977, including the UK where it reached number 15 in January 1978, and Australia where it peaked at number 86 in March 1978.

References

1931 songs
Songs about old age
Songs about nostalgia
Pop standards
Songs written by Herman Hupfeld
Jazz songs
Casablanca (film)
Jazz compositions in D major
Warner Bros.